The 2010–11 season was West Ham United's sixth consecutive season in the Premier League. After finishing in 17th place in the previous season, the team finished 20th and was relegated to the Football League Championship.

Season summary
The club appointed Avram Grant as their new manager on 3 June 2010, following the sacking of Gianfranco Zola at the end of a disappointing 2009–10 season. On 15 May 2011, West Ham were relegated to the Championship after a comeback from Wigan Athletic at the DW Stadium. With West Ham leading 2–0 at half-time by two Demba Ba goals, Wigan battled back to win 3–2 thanks to an added-time strike from Charles N'Zogbia.
Following the loss, West Ham announced the sacking of manager Avram Grant just one season into his tenure.

Final League Table

Squad

Out on loan

Results

Pre-season
West Ham scheduled six friendly games away from home, both within the UK as well as two tour matches in Germany and Austria, in preparation for the 2010–11 Premier League season. They also played host to Spanish La Liga club Deportivo de La Coruña at the Boleyn Ground.

Premier League

Football League Cup

FA Cup

Statistics

Overview

Goalscorers

League position by matchday

Appearances and goals

|-
! colspan=12 style=background:#dcdcdc; text-align:center| Goalkeepers

|-
! colspan=12 style=background:#dcdcdc; text-align:center| Defenders

|-
! colspan=12 style=background:#dcdcdc; text-align:center| Midfielders

|-
! colspan=12 style=background:#dcdcdc; text-align:center| Forwards

|}

Transfers

Summer

In

Out

Winter

In

Out

References

External links
 West Ham United FC Official Website

West Ham United
West Ham United F.C. seasons
West Ham United Fc Season, 2010–11
West Ham United Fc Season, 2010–11